Elmira (East) Airport  is a private airport near Elmira, Ontario, Canada.

See also
Elmira Airport

References

Registered aerodromes in Ontario
Transport in Woolwich, Ontario